Roberto Casalino (born 9 June 1979) is an Italian singer-songwriter. He composed, in collaboration with Tiziano Ferro, "Non ti scordar mai di me", "Stai fermo lì", "Novembre", brought to success in 2008 by Giusy Ferreri.

He has written songs for many Italian artists including Giusy Ferreri, Emma Marrone, Francesca Michielin, Fedez, and Marco Mengoni.

Biography

Early life
Born in Avellino, he moved to Rome with his family at the age of one and a half, and then in 1989 to Geilenkirchen, Germany, where he remained until 1993. He started playing the guitar at the age of 7 years, while in 1989 he debuted as a singer. In 1993 he returned to Italy, settling in Latina, where he began to attend musical environments. He joined in 1996 the Vibration Gospel Choir and a small band, with which he began performing in local clubs.

Equilibriolabile and solo career

In 1999 he started his own band, Equilibriolabile ("Weak balance"), that followed him on all occasions.

Throughout 2002, he accompanied Tiziano Ferro in his Rosso Relativo Tour in the role of a backing singer. Another artistic collaboration took place in the summer of the same year, when he wrote "Entro il 23" for the band Mp2.

In 2003, he self-published his band's album Variazioni sul tema and a few months later he collaborated with arranger and songwriter Mario Zannini Quirini.

Participate in the selections of the Festival di Sanremo in 2004 in the section "youth", arriving among the 51 finalists with the song "the demiurge", later included in her album L'atmosfera nascosta.

His debut on the national radio was in 2004. The single "Così non vale", produced by Lead/Venus, ranked first at the online chart for the Gran premio Della musica Italian d'estate ("Grand Prix of Summer Italian Music") 2004, a competition organized by Italy and Radio Italia and Video Italia. In July of the same year he composed theme song for the Giffoni Film Festival, which was then posted on his album L'atmosfera nascosta in 2009.

Between September and October 2004 Casalino joined the Tim Tour in the cities of Turin and Milan.

In 2007 he ranked among the 40 finalists of SanremoLab and among the 72 finalists of Sanremo Nuova Generazione, performing in front of the artistic committee. In 2009 he and his band performed at the prestigious music club Hope & Anchor in London.

In 2009, Casalino released his first solo album L'atmosfera nascosta, preceded by the single "L'atmosfera". The album featured fourteen tracks of both which he is the author of lyrics and music. His song "Mi vuoi bene o mi vuoi male", released on 9 October, went on to be aired on radios. He performed "L'atmofera" at the 2009 Venice Music Awards and at the 2009 Telethon Marathon, both broadcast live on Rai 2.

Discography

Studio albums
 2009 – L'atmosfera nascosta
 2014 – E Questo É Quanto
 2018 – Errori di felicità
 2019 – Il fabbricante di ricordi

Live albums
 2020 – Il Fabbricante Di Ricordi Live

Singles 
 2004 – "Così non vale"
 2007 – "L'esatto opposto"
 2009 – "L'atmosfera"
 2009 – "Mi vuoi bene o mi vuoi male"
 2014 – "Torno io se torni tu"
 2015 – "Ogni destino è originale"
 2017 – "Errori di felicità"
 2018 – "Le mie giornate"
 2018 – "Sgualcito cuore"
 2019 – "Diamante lei e luce lui"
 2019 – "Sul ciglio senza far rumore" (feat. Alessandra Amoroso)
 2020 – "Cullami"

References

External links
 

1979 births
Italian operatic baritones
Italian pop singers
Italian male singer-songwriters
Italian LGBT singers
Living people
People from Avellino
21st-century Italian male singers